Michael Carley (1940 – 17 March 2019) was an Irish Gaelic footballer who played for several clubs (St Mary's Rochfortbridge, St Loman's, The Downs and Tyrrellspass) and for the Westmeath county team. He usually lined out at Midfield. Carley is regarded as one of Westmeath's all-time greatest players.

Honours

St Mary's CBS
Leinster Colleges Senior B Football Championship (1): 1955

St Mary's Rochfortbridge
Westmeath Intermediate Football Championship (1): 1958

St Loman's
Westmeath Senior Football Championship (2): 1961, 1963

The Downs
Westmeath Senior Football Championship (5): 1968, 1969, 1970, 1972, 1974

Westmeath
O'Byrne Cup (2): 1959, 1964

Leinster
Railway Cup (2): 1961, 1962

References

1940 births
2019 deaths
Gaelic football backs
Leinster Gaelic footballers
Sportspeople from County Westmeath
Westmeath inter-county Gaelic footballers